El Salvador competed at the 1984 Summer Olympics in Los Angeles, California, United States, from 28 July to 12 August 1984. This was the nation's third appearance at the Olympics. The nation previously missed the 1976 Summer Olympics and participated in the 1980 Summer Olympics boycott.

Comité Olímpico de El Salvador sent a total of 10 athletes to the Games, 9 men and 1 women, to compete in 5 sports. Long-distance runner Kriscia García was chosen to carry her nation's flag during the opening ceremony.

Competitors 
Comité Olímpico de El Salvador selected a team of 10 athletes, 9 men and 1 women, to compete in 5 sports. Trap shooter Julio González, at age 40, was the oldest athlete of the team, while swimmer Juan Miranda was the youngest at age 16. 
The following is the list of number of competitors participating in the Games.

Athletics

Men
Track & road events

Women
Track & road events

Judo

Men

Swimming

Women

Shooting

Men

Wrestling

Men's Freestyle

Men's Greco-Roman

References

External Links
Official Olympic Results

Nations at the 1984 Summer Olympics
1984
Olympics